San Sebastián de Buenavista is a town and municipality of the Colombian Department of Magdalena. Founded in 1748 by Fernando de Mier y Guerra with the name San Sebastián de Melchiquejo, but was later changed on November 15, 1957 when it was erected municipality.

Politics

Administrative divisions

Corregimientos: 
Troncosito
Troncoso
Buenavista
El Coco
Las Margaritas
La Pacha
Los Galvis
San Valentín
Sabanas de Peralejo
Maria Antonia
Venero
El Seis
San Rafael
Santa Rosa
Dividivi

References

External links
 San Sebastián de Buenavista official website

Municipalities of Magdalena Department
Populated places established in 1748